Tisa Shakya (born 4 February 2003) is a Nepalese swimmer. She competed in the women's 100 metre breaststroke event at the 2017 World Aquatics Championships. In 2019, she won the bronze medal in the women's 200 m individual medley event at the 2019 South Asian Games held in Nepal.

References

2003 births
Living people
Nepalese female swimmers
Place of birth missing (living people)
Swimmers at the 2018 Asian Games
Asian Games competitors for Nepal
Female breaststroke swimmers
South Asian Games bronze medalists for Nepal
South Asian Games medalists in swimming
21st-century Nepalese women